Jiří Hájíček (born 11 September 1967 in České Budějovice) is a contemporary South Bohemian Czech writer. He started writing poetry in the 1980s in a youth poetry programme hosted by Mirek Kovářík. He won the 2006 Magnesia Litera prize for prose with his novel Selský baroko. In the European Society of Authors' 2013 Finnegan's List, Jaroslav Rudiš selected Hájíček's 2012 novel Rybí krev (Fish Blood) to be more widely translated into European languages. Rybí krev also won the Magnesia Litera Book of the Year for 2013. In 2016, his novel Zloději zelených koní was adapted into a film by Dan Wlodarczyk.

Work 

Snídaně na refýži (The Breakfast on Safety Island), 1998 – collection of short stories
Zloději zelených koní (The Green Horse Hustlers), 2001 – novel, published also in Hungarian in 2003. Filmed in 2016.
Dobrodruzi hlavního proudu(The Mainstream Adventurers), 2002 – novel
Dřevěný nůž (The Wooden Knife), 2004 – collection of short stories. Four of the stories are included in the English version of Rustic Baroque
Selský baroko, 2005 – novel, published in English as Rustic Baroque in 2012 as well as in Hungarian, Italian and Bulgarian
Fotbalové deníky (The Football Diaries), 2007 – novella
Rybí krev (Fish Blood), 2012 – novel
Dešťová hůl (The Rainstick), 2016 – novel
Lvíčata (Lion Cubs), 2017 – short story published in Best European Fiction 2017

References

External links 
 Official Website in English

1967 births
Living people
Czech novelists
Male novelists
Czech male writers
Magnesia Litera winners
Writers from České Budějovice
University of South Bohemia alumni